Woman Across the River is an album by the American blues musician Freddie King, released in 1973. It was the last of three albums King made for Shelter Records. King's three Shelter albums were re-released as a collection titled King of the Blues.

The album peaked at No. 158 on the Billboard 200.

Production
Like King's first two Shelter albums, Woman Across the River was produced by label head Leon Russell. King was backed by many session musicians, including Carl Radle on bass and Jim Keltner on drums. The album was mixed at Ardent Studios, in Memphis, Tennessee. King covered two Willie Dixon songs, "Hoochie Coochie Man" and "I'm Ready".

Critical reception

Texas Monthly called the album "more than competent," but thought that it made "a few too many concessions to the rock sound." AllMusic noted the "perhaps heavier rock elements," writing that "King's last Shelter album was his most elaborately produced, with occasional string arrangements and female backups vocals." The Penguin Guide to Blues Recordings opined that it "reflects the awkward phase blues was going through in the early '70s." The Commercial Appeal praised the "exquisite Russell ballad" "Help Me Through the Day".

Track listing

References

External links
 

Freddie King albums
1973 albums
Shelter Records albums
Albums produced by Leon Russell